Harry Weber (born 1942 St. Louis, Missouri) is an American sculptor.

Early life
Harry Weber was born in St. Louis, Missouri in 1942  where he attended St. Louis Country Day School. He was educated at Princeton University where he studied art history.

Following his education, Weber served six years in the United States Navy.  This included a year on river patrol boats in Vietnam where he compiled a compelling series of drawings chronicling his experiences there.

Recognition

Weber's sculptures have won major awards at national juried competitions,  and are in private collections in the United States and abroad.  His work has appeared on the covers of several national magazines. He has installed work in twelve different states, Gabon and the Bahamas.

His sculptures have been featured at the Museum of Fine Art in  Newport, Rhode Island and are in the permanent collections of  the National Dog Museum and the National Baseball Hall of Fame and Museum in Cooperstown, New York.  A selection of his Vietnam war sketches are being shown in behalf of the Wounded Warrior Project in Mobile, Alabama.

Two of his sculptural groups have been designated National Lewis and Clark sites by the Federal Parks Department. This includes a twice life sized grouping of Lewis and Clark on the St. Louis Riverfront which commemorated the final celebration of the bicentennial of the expedition. He was selected in 2010, in a national competition, to sculpt a statue of Dred Scott and Harriet Scott, which was unveiled on June 8, 2012, at the Old Courthouse (St. Louis, Missouri) where the initial court cases were heard.

His sculptures of famous sports figures are prominent features at twelve different professional and amateur stadiums, including Busch Stadium in St. Louis, MO, the TD Garden in Boston, Massachusetts, and Kauffman Stadium in Kansas City, Missouri.  In 2011 he was named the Sports Sculptor of the Year by the United States Sports Academy.

References

 https://www.nytimes.com/2009/04/28/sports/baseball/28vecsey.html
 http://sports.espn.go.com/espn/commentary/news/story?page=howard/110421
 http://blog.al.com/entertainment-press-register/2011/04/sports_academy_donates_artwork.html
 http://universitycity.patch.com/articles/chuck-berry-statue-should-be-in-the-loop-by-april
 https://www.nytimes.com/2007/04/04/sports/baseball/04statue.html
 http://www.ussa.edu/publications/news/2010/10/04/harry-weber-named-2011-sport-artist-of-the-year-sculptor/
 http://www.boston.com/sports/hockey/bruins/extras/bruins_blog/2010/05/orr_statue_unve.html
 http://www.lewisandclarktravel.com/index.php/site/lewis_clark_statue_underwater_near_st_louis_arch/
 http://blogs.riverfronttimes.com/atoz/2010/09/chuck_berry_statue_st_louis_delmar_loop_harry_weber_joe_edwards.php
 http://www.hectv.org/programs/series/state-of-the-arts/1030/august-2011/#play1276
 https://www.nytimes.com/2011/10/27/sports/baseball/albert-pujols-wont-find-unconditional-love-elsewhere-george-vecsey.html
 http://m.stltoday.com/STL/db_259737/contentdetail.htm?contentguid=IT2otCLD
 http://fox2now.com/2012/06/08/dred-scott-statue-ready-to-be-installed/
 http://www.cbsnews.com/video/watch/?id=50157041n
 http://www.stltoday.com/lifestyles/columns/joe-holleman/lewis-and-clark-statue-lined-up-for-westward-migration-from/article_9c75a4c9-be6e-5ba4-a011-3f81345a789c.html#.UxejUl3x4es.email
 http://www.hectv.org/video/14616/sculptor-harry-weber-st-louis-blues-bull-bear/
 https://www.youtube.com/watch?v=0GFEhG03JY4
 http://www.elvismatters.com/index.php?pagina=nieuws&id=11407&pad=
 http://www.stanleycupofchowder.com/2010/4/29/1451563/get-to-know-the-man-behind-the
 http://www.chesterfieldarts.org/node/69
 https://www.rollingstone.com/music/news/chuck-berry-statue-unveiled-in-st-louis-20110729

External links 
 Harry Weber

1942 births
Living people
Princeton University alumni
United States Navy personnel of the Vietnam War
Artists from St. Louis
20th-century American sculptors
20th-century American male artists
American male sculptors
Sculptors from Missouri
United States Navy sailors